Ronald Robert Yager (born New York City) is an American researcher in computational intelligence, decision making under uncertainty and fuzzy logic.  He is currently Director of the Machine Intelligence Institute and Professor of Information Systems at Iona College.

Ronald Yager has been an active IEEE Fellow since 1997 for his contributions to the development of the theory of fuzzy logic. He is the Editor and Chief of the International Journal of Intelligent Systems. He has also been invited to serve on the Editorial Boards and Executive Advisory Boards in a number of international journals, which include the following: IEEE Intelligent Systems, IEEE Transactions on Fuzzy Systems, and Fuzzy Sets and Systems.

Biography 
Ronald R. Yager was born in the University Heights neighborhood of the Bronx, New York City and attended elementary and DeWitt Clinton High School in the New York City public school system.  He got a Bachelor's degree in Electrical Engineering from the City College of New York.  He holds a Ph.D. in Systems Science, a degree that he got from the Polytechnic Institute of Brooklyn (now known as the Polytechnic Institute of New York University).  He is currently Director of the Machine Intelligence Institute and Professor of Information Systems at Iona College (New York).  He previously taught at the Pennsylvania State University.

Honors and awards 
 Recipient of IEEE Frank Rosenblatt Award, 2016
 Recipient of 2006 FLINS Gold Medal (Fuzzy Logic and Intelligent Technologies in Nuclear Science)
 Recipient of IEEE Outstanding Contributor Award Granular Computing, 2006
 Recipient of Medal of the 50th Anniversary of the Polish Academy of Sciences, 2005
 IEEE Computational Intelligence Society Fuzzy Systems Pioneer Award, 2004 
 Fellow of the IEEE for contributions to the development of the theory of fuzzy logic
 Fellow New York of the Academy of Sciences
 Fellow of the International Fuzzy Systems Association
 Honoris Causa, Rostov on the Don University, Russia
 Three-year NASA Fellowship
 Tau Beta Pi, Eta Kappa Nu, Sigma Xi, Cum Laude

References

Further reading
Ordered weighted averaging aggregation operator
Construction of t-norms
Fuzzy cognitive map
Fuzzy logic
 International Journal of Intelligent Systems
 Ronald R. Yager – Curriculum Vitae at IEEE Intelligent Systems IS’12
 Ronald R. Yager – Publications
 Some Basic Results of Fuzzy Research in the ISI Web of Knowledge

Polytechnic Institute of New York University alumni
American computer scientists
Living people
Fellow Members of the IEEE
Artificial intelligence researchers
Year of birth missing (living people)